Monica Ndaya Kanyinda, known as Monica Ndaya, is a DR Congolese footballer who plays as a defender for OCL City and the DR Congo women's national team.

Club career
Ndaya has played for FCF Bafana Bafana and OCL City in the Democratic Republic of the Congo.

International career
Ndaya capped for the DR Congo at senior level during the 2020 CAF Women's Olympic Qualifying Tournament (third round).

See also
 List of Democratic Republic of the Congo women's international footballers

References

Living people
Democratic Republic of the Congo women's footballers
Women's association football defenders
Democratic Republic of the Congo women's international footballers
Year of birth missing (living people)